Coleus argentatus, synonym Plectranthus argentatus, common name silver spurflower, is a species of flowering plant in the mint family. It is native to rock outcrops and rainforest in the border region of Queensland and New South Wales, Australia. The hairy leaves are ovate to broad-ovate, 5–11.5 cm long, 3–5.5 cm wide with crenate margins. The hairs give the plant an overall sage green to silvery colour.

Originally described by Queensland botanist Stanley Thatcher Blake, its specific epithet  argentatus is Latin for "silver", referring to its foliage.

Cultivation
Coleus argentatus is cultivated in temperate regions as an ornamental bedding plant for its attractive silvery foliage. It strikes readily from cuttings, or can be grown from seed as a half-hardy annual. It has gained the Royal Horticultural Society's Award of Garden Merit.

References

argentatus
Flora of New South Wales
Flora of Queensland
Garden plants of Australia
Groundcovers